Emanuele Moncini (born 13 October 1973 in Breno, Italy) is an Italian racing driver currently competing in the FIA GT1 World Championship for Sunred.

Moncini raced in the Italian Superturismo Championship before embarking on an international career. In 1999 he raced in the Sports Racing World Cup where he won one round at Enna-Pergusa.

He was vice-champion in the Italian GT Championship in 2008 and won the European Abarth 500 Trophy the following year.

Moncini returned to the Italian GT Championship in 2010 and won the championship in a Villorba Corse Ferrari 430 alongside ex-Formula 1 driver Andrea Montermini, with five wins. He graduated to the International GT Open in 2011.

References

External links

1973 births
Living people
Sportspeople from the Province of Brescia
Italian racing drivers
FIA GT1 World Championship drivers